Gauri Pathare is an Indian musician and a winner of the All India Radio competition.

Personal life 
Gauri Pathare holds a degree in Computer Science from the University of Pune and a Diploma in IT from NIIT.
During her early years, she won numerous inter-collegiate, inter-university and inter-state trophies. She also won the All India Radio competition.

Pathare was the vocal accompaniment to Pt. Suresh Talwalkar for his taal maala concerts in her initial years. In addition to singing, Pathare has been interested in cooking and has appeared on a number of cookery shows.

Training 
Having initially trained under the guidance of Pt. Gangadharbuwa Pimpalkhare of Kirana gharana, Pathare received knowledge in music from late Pt. Jitendra Abhisheki and Pandita Padmatai Talwalkar for several years. Since 2010, she has been receiving Jaipur gharana training under Pt. Arun Dravid. Her training under different Gurus influenced her gayaki. She has trained in the 3 Gharanas - Jaipur-Atrauli gharana, Gwalior gharana and Kirana Gharana.

Gauri has blended Jaipur, Gwalior and Kirana Gharana gayaki to form her own style of Khyal presentation. She has been trained in various voice culture techniques by Ustaad Syeeduddin Daagar (cousin of Wasifuddin Dagar), a noted Dhrupad Dhamar singer.

Performances 
Gauri has performed at most of the prestigious classical music festivals in India including Sawai Gandharva Mahotsav, Tansen festival, Chandigarh Sangeet Sammelan, Kesarbai Kerkar Sammelan, Pt. Kumar Gandharva Sangeet Sammelan, etc. She has frequently performed in India, France, Switzerland, USA, Australia, Canada, Dubai, United Kingdom and Singapore.

Gauri has conducted numerous classical music workshops overseas and has had her live performances broadcast on Australian radio.

Here are some of the performances:

Rag Malhar

Rag Nand

Rag Jog

Rag Lalit

Rag: Lalitagauri

Rag:Sawani Kalyan

Rag: Hameer

Semi - classical section

Dadra--Yaad Piya ki Aaye

Rangi sari gulabi chunariya- dadra

Kaise jiya tarasat-Dadra

He Suranno Chandra Vha- natyageet

Bhairavi

Marathi-bhajan (1)

Marathi -bhajan (2)

Hindi( Nirguni) bhajan

Awards 
 Smt. Kesarbai Kerkar scholarship conferred by the NCPA  - 2000-2001.
 Smt. Yamunadevi Shahane Puraskar by Ganwardhan, Pune - 2002
 Shree Sitaram Dixit Puraskar for Semi Classical Vocal Music - 2003
 Gyanacharya Pt. Ramakrishnabuwa Vaze Yuwa Gayak Puraskar - by Gandharva Mahavidyalaya, Pune - 2006
 Surmani Puraskar - 2006
 Sur Mani Puraskar by Sur Singar Parishad - 2007
 Album "Tribute" was nominated for Global Indian Music Awards - 2010
 Sangeet Ratna Puraskar by Kashi Gayan Samj, Varanasi - 2010
 "Swarabhaskar" Puraskar instituted in the memory of Late Pandit Bhimsen Joshi - 2012 - 2013.
 Aditya Vikram Birla "Kala Kiran Puraskar" - 2013

Media recognition 
 Maharashtra Times 
 Meet Kalakar 
 The Hindu
 The Times of India
 India Herald
 IBN Lokmat - Interview
 Afternoon Dispatch & Courier - Gauri Pathare a Verstalie Singer

CD releases

References 

Year of birth missing (living people)
Living people
Indian women classical singers
Savitribai Phule Pune University alumni